The 2001 Stanley Cup Finals was the championship series of the National Hockey League's (NHL) 2000–01 season, and the culmination of the 2001 Stanley Cup playoffs. It was contested between the Eastern Conference champion and defending Stanley Cup champion New Jersey Devils and the Western Conference champion and Presidents' Trophy-winning Colorado Avalanche. It was Colorado's second appearance in the Finals, and the first since the team won the Cup in 1996. It was New Jersey's third appearance in the Finals and second straight appearance after winning the Cup in the previous year.

Colorado defeated New Jersey in seven games to win their second Stanley Cup in franchise history. Colorado's Patrick Roy was awarded the Conn Smythe Trophy as the MVP of the 2001 playoffs. This was the first Stanley Cup Finals since  that would be decided in the maximum seven games. This was also the first and, as of 2022, most recent Finals since  that the number one seeds in each conference met in the Finals. This marked the only time in NHL history where two teams who occupied the same market at different times faced off against each other. The Devils were based out of Denver as the Colorado Rockies from 1976 to 1982 and the Avalanche established themselves in the city in 1995 after relocating from Quebec City.

Paths to the Finals

New Jersey defeated the Carolina Hurricanes 4–2, the Toronto Maple Leafs 4–3 and the Pittsburgh Penguins 4–1 to advance to the Finals.

Colorado defeated the Vancouver Canucks 4–0, the Los Angeles Kings 4–3 and the St. Louis Blues 4–1 to advance to the Finals.

Game summaries
This was the second straight Finals that featured two relocated NHL teams and the first ever Finals that featured two teams playing in a city that was the previous home of one team and the present home of another. The Colorado Rockies were formerly based in Denver and were relocated to East Rutherford and renamed the New Jersey Devils prior to the  season. The Quebec Nordiques were relocated to Denver and renamed the Colorado Avalanche prior to the  season.

Colorado centre Joe Sakic scored his 10th and 11th goal of the playoffs in the first and second periods of game one. The Avalanche smothered the New Jersey defense and scored five goals in the game. The Devils did not score any goals, and in the third period, after the game was 5–0, things culminated in a fistfight between the Avalanche's Chris Dingman and the Devils' Sean O'Donnell. The third period had a total tally of 44 penalty minutes accumulated by both clubs.

The second game began with goals in the first period by Colorado's Sakic and New Jersey's Bob Corkum and Turner Stevenson. The 2–1 lead by the Devils held throughout the game as they defeated the Avalanche to even the series at one game apiece.

Game three was held in New Jersey. Devils centre Jason Arnott scored an early power-play goal, but in the tenth minute, the Avalanche evened through defenceman Martin Skoula. Neither team scored any goals in the second period. Early in the third, Colorado defenceman Ray Bourque scored a power-play goal to break the tie. Five minutes later, Colorado winger Dan Hinote scored the team's third goal, and the Devils did not respond. The win by Colorado marked another road win in the series.

In the first period of game four, Colorado scored an early goal when Rob Blake shot the puck past Devils goalkeeper Martin Brodeur. Patrik Elias and New Jersey responded when he scored a short-handed goal to even the score at one goal apiece. Later in the second, Avalanche centre Chris Drury scored to give the Avalanche a one-goal lead going into the third period. But the third period belonged to the Devils: Scott Gomez and Petr Sykora each scored a goal in the third, and Brodeur stopped every puck that went his way. The New Jersey offence overwhelmed the Avalanche defense as they managed 35 shots; Colorado managed only 12 shots. New Jersey again evened the series, this time at two games apiece.

In Colorado for game five, Devils forward Patrik Elias started the scoring for the Devils as they jumped out to an early one-goal lead. Exactly seven minutes later, Colorado winger Alex Tanguay tied the game on the power-play. However, in the late minutes of the first period, New Jersey forward Alexander Mogilny scored the game's eventual winner. In the second period, Devils forward Sergei Brylin scored a power-play goal to give the Devils a two-goal lead, and in the third period, centre John Madden scored a fourth goal for insurance. The Devils won and reclaimed the home-ice advantage; they eventually won 4–1. They forced the Avalanche to try to win on the road to force a Game 7 in Denver.

Game six paralleled game one for the Avalanche. The Devils tested the Avalanche early with a barrage of shots on goaltender Patrick Roy. After stopping them all, and with two minutes remaining in the first period, Colorado defenceman Adam Foote scored an unassisted goal to give the Avalanche the lead on just their fourth shot. Early in the second period, Avalanche winger Ville Nieminen scored a power-play goal, and late in the second period, Drury scored his 11th goal of the playoffs to give the Avalanche a commanding lead entering the third period. Alex Tanguay scored the only goal of the third period and the Avalanche won to force a deciding game seven in Denver. Despite Colorado's high number of penalty minutes, the Devils were unable to put anything past Roy.

Around eight minutes into game seven, Alex Tanguay of the Avalanche scored the period's only goal. Colorado then scored two consecutive goals in the second period: another by Tanguay, his sixth of the playoffs, and a power-play goal scored by Joe Sakic, his 13th of the playoffs. Shortly after Sakic's goal, Petr Sykora and the Devils sprang into life when he scored a power-play goal. It left the Devils with only two goals to overcome, but Roy and the Avalanche would prove too much for the Devils in the third period as Colorado defensively shut the door on New Jersey to win the game and the series.

The Avalanche winning the Stanley Cup made this the second straight year that the defending champions lost in the Finals, as the Devils themselves defeated the 1999 Cup champion Dallas Stars the year before. This was the first and only Stanley Cup championship for defenceman Ray Bourque who, after being traded from the Boston Bruins to Colorado in 2000, retired from the NHL after the Avalanche's 2001 Cup win. This was the last major professional sports championship won by a Denver-based team until 2016, when the Denver Broncos won Super Bowl 50 in the 2015 NFL season. This would also be the Avalanche's last Stanley Cup title and Finals appearance until 2022, when they defeated the defending champion Tampa Bay Lightning in six games.

Team rosters
Years indicated in boldface under the "Finals appearance" column signify that the player won the Stanley Cup in the given year.

Colorado Avalanche

New Jersey Devils

Stanley Cup engraving
The 2001 Stanley Cup was presented to Avalanche captain Joe Sakic by NHL Commissioner Gary Bettman following the Avalanche's 3–1 win over the Devils in game seven

The following Avalanche players and staff had their names engraved on the Stanley Cup

2000–01 Colorado Avalanche

Broadcasting
In Canada, the series was televised on CBC. In the United States, ESPN aired the first two games while ABC broadcast the rest of the series.

See also
 2000–01 NHL season

References

External links

 
Stanley Cup
Colorado Avalanche games
New Jersey Devils games
Stanley Cup Finals
Sports competitions in East Rutherford, New Jersey
Stanley Cup Finals
Stanley Cup Finals
Ice hockey competitions in Denver
2000s in Denver
21st century in East Rutherford, New Jersey
Ice hockey competitions in New Jersey